Hugo Anton Fisher (1854 – November 27, 1916) was an artist primarily known for painting landscapes in watercolor.  He was born into a family of artists in Kladno, Bohemia. In 1874, he immigrated to New York, and in 1886, he moved to Alameda, California with his wife and children.  About 1894, Fisher moved to Hawaii and opened a studio in Honolulu, but he left Hawaii for the mainland late in 1896.  Fisher died in Alameda, California in 1916.

One of Fisher's children, Hugo Melville Fisher (1878–1946), was a California-based impressionist painter.  The Adirondack Museum (Blue Mountain Lake, New York), the Fine Arts Museums of San Francisco, the Hawaii State Art Museum, the Jersey City Museum (Jersey City, New Jersey), the Oakland Museum of California, and Thiel College (Greenville, Pennsylvania) are among the public collections holding work by Hugo Anton Fisher.

References
 Forbes, David W., He Makana, The Gertrude Mary Joan Damon Haig Collection of Hawaiian Art, Paintings and Prints, Hawaii State Foundation of Culture and the Arts, 2013, pp. 26–27
 Severson, Don R. Finding Paradise: Island Art in Private Collections, University of Hawaii Press, 2002, pp. 82–3.

Footnotes

19th-century American painters
American male painters
20th-century American painters
American landscape painters
Artists from Hawaii
Czech painters
Czech male painters
1916 deaths
1854 births
19th-century American male artists
20th-century American male artists